Orndorff is a surname.

Orndorff may also refer to:

Mount Orndorff, Antarctica
Orendorf Site, archaeological site in Canton, Fulton County, Illinois, U.S.

See also
Orndoff (disambiguation)